The 1887 Indianapolis Hoosiers finished with a 37–89 record in the National League, finishing in last place in their first season in Indianapolis. They had played the previous three seasons in St. Louis, Missouri as the Maroons.

Offseason 
Following the 1886 season, the Maroons franchise was purchased by the National League and subsequently sold to John T. Brush. On March 8, the Hoosiers additionally purchased a number of players who were under league control. Technically, these players were purchased from the Maroons franchise. Among these players were Henry Boyle, John Cahill, Jerry Denny, Jack Glasscock, Egyptian Healy, John Kirby, Jack McGeachey, George Myers, Otto Schomberg, and Emmett Seery.

Notable transactions 
 March 9, 1887: The Hoosiers obtained Mert Hackett and Charley Bassett, who had been under league control, for $1,000.

Regular season

Season standings

Record vs. opponents

Notable transactions 
 July 2, 1887: John Kirby was sold by the Hoosiers to the Cleveland Blues for $800 to $1000.
 August 15, 1887: Lev Shreve was purchased by the Hoosiers from the Baltimore Orioles.
 August 19, 1887: Tom Brown was signed by the Hoosiers as a free agent.

Roster

Player stats

Batting

Starters by position 
Note: Pos = Position; G = Games played; AB = At bats; H = Hits; Avg. = Batting average; HR = Home runs; RBI = Runs batted in

Other batters 
Note: G = Games played; AB = At bats; H = Hits; Avg. = Batting average; HR = Home runs; RBI = Runs batted in

Pitching

Starting pitchers 
Note: G = Games pitched; IP = Innings pitched; W = Wins; L = Losses; ERA = Earned run average; SO = Strikeouts

Other pitchers 
Note: G = Games pitched; IP = Innings pitched; W = Wins; L = Losses; ERA = Earned run average; SO = Strikeouts

Relief pitchers 
Note: G = Games pitched; W = Wins; L = Losses; SV = Saves; ERA = Earned run average; SO = Strikeouts

Notes

References 
 1887 Indianapolis Hoosiers team page at Baseball Reference

Indianapolis Hoosiers
Indianapolis Hoosiers season